Esporte Clube São Judas Tadeu, commonly known as São Judas Tadeu, is a Brazilian men's and women's football club based in Jaguariúna, São Paulo state.

History
The club was founded on March 29, 2007.

Men's team
The men's team competed in the Campeonato Paulista Segunda Divisão in 2011.

Women's team
The women's team competed in the Campeonato Paulista Feminino in 2010.

Stadium

Esporte Clube São Judas Tadeu play their home games at Estádio Municipal Alfredo Chiavegato. The stadium has a maximum capacity of 15,000 people.

References

Association football clubs established in 2007
Women's football clubs in Brazil
Football clubs in São Paulo (state)
2007 establishments in Brazil